The year 1657 in music involved some significant events.

Events 
March 11 – Johann Adam Reincken becomes organist of the Bergkerk at Deventer.
July 17 – Following the death of Tobias Michael in June, Sebastian Knüpfer is appointed Thomaskantor at Leipzig.
Maurizio Cazzati becomes the Maestro di Cappella at San Petronio in Bologna and opens his violin school in Bologna.
King Louis XIV of France engages Étienne Richard as royal harpsichord teacher, in place of Jacques Champion de Chambonnières.

Popular music
Gaspar de Verlit – Anthology of Christmas carols

Classical music 
Henri Dumont – Meslanges à 2, 3, 4 et 5 parties
Joannes Florentius a Kempis – Cantiones Natalitiae
Giovanni Legrenzi – Salmi a cinque
Heinrich Schütz 
12 Geistliche Gesänge, Op.13
Herr, nun lässest du deinen Diener, SWV 432-433
Barbara Strozzi – Ariette a voce sola, Op.6

Opera
Francesco Cavalli – Artemisia
Michel de La Guerre – Triomphe de l'Amour sur les Bergers et les Bergères (sung in 1655, but first staged as an opera in 1657)

Births 
March 18 – Giuseppe Ottavio Pitoni, organist and composer (died 1743)
July 25 – Philipp Heinrich Erlebach, composer (died 1714)
December 15 – Michel Richard Delalande, French composer and organist (died 1726)
probable – Gaetano Greco, composer (died c.1728)

Deaths 
March – John Hilton the younger, lutenist and composer (born c.1599)
March 26 – Jacob van Eyck, nobleman and musician (born c.1590)
June 26 – Tobias Michael (born 1592)
October 21 – Alessandro Costantini (born c. 1581)
October 23 – Domenico Massenzio, Italian composer (born 1586)
date unknown
Franciszek Lilius, composer (born c. 1600)
Pietro Paolo Sabbatini, composer (born 1600)

References 

 
17th century in music
Music by year